Khvoshab-e Sofla (also Romanized as Khvoshāb-e Soflá and Khowshāb-e Soflá; also known as Khvoshāb-e Pā’īn) is a village in Deymkaran Rural District, Salehabad District, Bahar County, Hamadan Province, Iran. At the 2006 census, its population was 600, in 133 families.

References 

Populated places in Bahar County